The pous ( podes; , poûs) or Greek foot ( feet) was a Greek unit of length. It had various subdivisions whose lengths varied by place and over time. 100 podes made up one plethron, 600 podes made up a stade (the Greek furlong) and 5000 made up a milion (the Greek mile). The Greek pous also has long, median and short forms.

The pous spread throughout much of Europe and the Middle East during the Hellenic period preceding and following the conquests of Alexander the Great and remained in use as a Byzantine unit until the Fall of Constantinople in 1453.

Comparative analysis
A pous is divided into digits or fingers (daktyloi) which are multiplied as shown. Generally the sexagesimal or decimal multiples have Mesopotamian origins while the septenary multiples have Egyptian origins.

Greek measures of short median and long podes can be thought of as based on body measures.  The lengths may be compared to the Imperial/U.S. foot of 304.8 mm. Stecchini and others propose the Greek podes are different sizes because they are divided into different numbers of different sized daktylos to facilitate different calculations. The most obvious place to observe the relative difference is in the Greek orders of architecture whose canon of proportions is based on column diameters.

References

Mathematical and metrological references

Linguistic references

Classical references

Archaeological historical references

Medieval references

Human-based units of measurement
Units of length
Ancient Greek units of measurement

ca:Llista d'unitats de longitud de l'antiga Grècia#Pous